Aaron Bunsen Lerner (September 21, 1920 – February 3, 2007), also known in scientific articles as Aaron B. Lerner, was an American physician, researcher and professor.

Life and career
Born in 1920 in Minneapolis, Lerner received his medical degree and a PhD in chemistry from the University of Minnesota in 1945. After teaching at the universities of Michigan and Oregon, he joined the Yale University School of Medicine as an associate professor of medicine in 1955. The following year he became director of the dermatology section within the Department of Internal Medicine, and when the Department of Dermatology was established in 1971 he was appointed its first chair. When Professor Lerner retired in 1991, he was named a Professor Emeritus of Dermatology. He was in 1973 elected to membership in the National Academy of Sciences (Medical physiology and metabolism).

Dr. Lerner is perhaps best known for leading the team of researchers who isolated and named, in 1958, the hormone melatonin. He was an expert in the metabolic basis of inherited diseases, particularly vitiligo for which he, in the 1980s, developed a skin transplantation therapy. Lerner also isolated the compound melanocyte-stimulating hormone (MSH).

Dr. Lerner was married to Marguerite Rush Lerner, M.D., an author of children's books and a book about admission to medical school (Medical School: The Interview and the Applicant). Their sons Ethan A. Lerner, M.D., Ph.D. and Michael R. Lerner, M.D., Ph.D. are both dermatologists and successful entrepreneurs. Ethan Lerner is associate professor of dermatology at Harvard Medical School and the Massachusetts General Hospital. Michael Lerner is in practice in San Diego, California.

References

External links
 Aaron Lerner Papers (MS 1896). Manuscripts and Archives, Yale University Library.

American dermatologists
1920 births
2007 deaths
University of Minnesota College of Science and Engineering alumni
Yale School of Medicine faculty
Members of the United States National Academy of Sciences
American medical researchers
University of Minnesota Medical School alumni
Members of the National Academy of Medicine